The 1962–63 Yugoslav First League season was the 17th season of the First Federal League, the top level association football league of SFR Yugoslavia, since its establishment in 1946. Fourteen teams contested the competition, with Partizan winning their fifth title.

Teams
Due to the expansion of the league from 12 to 14 clubs two teams were relegated at the end of the previous season (Vardar and Borac) and four were promoted - Budućnost, Radnički Niš, Željezničar and Sloboda.

League table

Results

Winning squad
Champions:
FK Partizan (head coach: Stjepan Bobek)

Player (league matches/league goals)
Vladica Kovačević (26/14)
Milutin Šoškić (26/0) (goalkeeper)
Milan Galić (25/16)
Fahrudin Jusufi (25/0)
Velibor Vasović (24/2)
Ljubomir Mihajlović (23/0)
Milan Vukelić (18/2)
Joakim Vislavski (16/7)
Zvezdan Čebinac (16/0)
Bora Milutinović (15/1)
Velimir Sombolac (14/0)
Mustafa Hasanagić (12/4)
Anton Rudinski (8/6)
Aleksandar Jončić (8/0)
Ivan Rajić (6/1)
Lazar Radović (5/2)
Milorad Milutinović (5/0)
Ilija Mitić (5/0)
Dragomir Slišković (5/0)
Branislav Mihajlović (4/1)
Mane Bajić (4/0)
Miodrag Petrović (3/1)
Vladimir Petrović (3/0)
Dragoslav Jovanović (2/0)
Milan Damjanović (1/0)
Zenun Brovina
Dimitrije Davidović
Poljan
Jankulovski
Milanović
Source:

Top scorers

See also
1962–63 Yugoslav Second League
1962–63 Yugoslav Cup

References

External links
Yugoslavia Domestic Football Full Tables

Yugoslav First League seasons
Yugo
1962–63 in Yugoslav football